Chirang may refer to:

Chirang district,  a district in Assam, India
an alternative spelling of Tsirang, a town in Bhutan